Medetomidine is a synthetic drug used as both a surgical anesthetic and analgesic.  It is often used as the hydrochloride salt, medetomidine hydrochloride, a crystalline white solid.  It is an α2 adrenergic agonist that can be administered as an intravenous drug solution with sterile water. 

It was developed by Orion Pharma. It is approved for dogs in the United States, and distributed in the United States by Pfizer Animal Health and by Novartis Animal Health in Canada under the product name Domitor.  Other alpha-two agonists used in veterinary medicine include xylazine and detomidine, but their use is less common in small animal surgery.  The marketed product is a racemic mixture of two stereoisomers; dexmedetomidine is the isomer with more useful effects, and is now marketed as Dexdomitor. The free base form of medetomidine is sold as Selektope for use as an antifouling substance in marine paints.

Veterinary use

In veterinary anesthesia, medetomidine is often used in combinations with opioids (butorphanol, buprenorphine etc.) as premedication (before a general anesthetic) in healthy cats and dogs.  It can be given by intramuscular injection (IM), subcutaneous injection (SC) or intravenous injection (IV). When delivered intravenously, a significantly decreased dose is used.  Some authors suggest a sublingual route is also effective.  It is not recommended for diabetics, it is contraindicated in patients with cardiac disease.
Due to its potent sedative effects it is commonly used in more aggressive animals, where a drug combination with a lesser effect (such as acepromazine plus an opioid, or  an opioid plus a benzodiazepine) would not allow the administration of the inductive agent without risk to the veterinarian.  As such the use of alpha-two agonists is only recommended in healthy animals.

Following administration, marked peripheral vasoconstriction and bradycardia are noted.  Often the dosage of induction agents (e.g. propofol) may be drastically reduced, as may the volumes of anesthetic gases (i.e. halothane, isoflurane, sevoflurane) used to maintain general anesthesia.

It is sometimes used in combination with butorphanol and ketamine (given IM) to produce general anaesthesia for short periods in healthy but fractious felines that will not allow an intravenous induction agent to be given.  It provides a good degree of muscle relaxation, an important factor in ketamine based anesthesia protocols.

Medetomidine has also been used in combination with morphine (or methadone), lidocaine and ketamine in constant rate infusion analgesia in canines.  It is often used in so called microdoses for this analgesic effect.

It is thought that this family of drugs has a degree of analgesic action, though this is, in comparison to the sedative effect, minor.

Its effects can be reversed using atipamezole (distributed as Antisedan by Pfizer). IV use of atipamezole is not licensed, IM is the preferred route.  Yohimbine may also be used in an emergency situation, but is not licensed.

Use in marine paint
Medetomidine can be used as an antifouling substance in marine paint. It is mainly effective against barnacles, but has also shown effect on other hard fouling like tube worms. When the barnacle cyprid larva encounters a surface containing medetomidine the molecule interacts with the octopamine receptor in the larva. This causes the settling larva to increase its kicking to more than 100 kicks per minute, which makes becoming sessile nearly impossible. When the larva swims away from the surface, the effect disappears (reversible effect). The larva regains its pre-exposure function and can settle somewhere else.

References

Further reading 

 
 
 
 

Alpha-2 adrenergic receptor agonists
Imidazoles
Sedatives
Veterinary drugs

hu:Medetomidin